Nursery World is a fortnightly magazine for early years education and  childcare professionals in the United Kingdom. It was first published in 1925 by Faber and Gwyer and sold to Benn Brothers in 1927 in exchange for ten years' royalty payments.

The magazine is now published in print form and online. The editor is Liz Roberts. In 2007, Haymarket Media Group acquired Nursery World from TSL Education. In April 2013, Haymarket sold Nursery World to Mark Allen Group.

It organises an annual show, the Nursery World Show, which is co-sponsored by 4Children, the National Children's Bureau, the Professional Association for Childcare and Early Years and the Pre-school Learning Alliance.

References

External links 
 Nursery World website

1925 establishments in the United Kingdom
Biweekly magazines published in the United Kingdom
Early childhood education in the United Kingdom
Education magazines
Health magazines
Magazines established in 1925
Magazines published in London
Online magazines published in the United Kingdom